The modern usage of the automotive term manumatic denotes an automatic transmission that allows the driver to select a specific gear, typically using paddle-shifters, steering wheel-mounted push-buttons, or "+" and "-" controls on the gear selector.

In the 1950s, the Automotive Products company in the United Kingdom produced an automated clutch system for automobiles called the Manumatic. This system was installed in cars with a manual transmission, allowing them to be driven without needing to use a clutch pedal.

Automatic transmissions 

Since the popularization of the hydraulic automatic transmission in the 1940s, many automatic transmissions have allowed indirect control of the gear selection, usually in the form of locking out higher gears. This was provided to allow engine braking on downhills or prevent the use of overdrive gears when towing and was typically achieved using positions such as "3", "2", and "1" on the gear selector.

An automatic transmission with a manumatic function provides a greater level of control by allowing the driver to request an upshift or downshift at a specific time. This is usually achieved using "+" and "-" positions on the gear selector or with paddle-shifters mounted beside the steering wheel. Manufacturers use a variety of tradenames for the manumatic function, as listed below.

The driver often does not have full control of the gear selection, as most manumatic modes will deny a gear change request that would result in the engine stalling (from too few RPM) or over-revving. Some transmissions will hold the requested gear indefinitely, while others will return to automatic gear selection after a period of time.

Tradenames 

Alfa Romeo: Sportronic, Q-System, Q-Tronic
Alpina: Switchtronic
Aston Martin: Touchtronic
BMW: Steptronic
Chevrolet / Saturn: TAPshift
Chrysler / Dodge / Jeep / Ram: AutoStick
Ford (Australia): Sequential Sports Shift
Ford (USA): SelectShift
Holden: Active Select
Honda / Acura: S-matic, MultiMatic, SportShift
Hyundai: Shiftronic, HIVEC H-Matic
Infiniti: Manual Shift Mode
Jaguar: Bosch Mechatronic
Kia: Sportmatic
Lancia: Comfortronic
Land Rover: CommandShift
Lexus: E-Shift
Lincoln: SelectShift
Mazda: ActiveMatic, SportMatic (North America)
Mercedes-Benz: TouchShift, G-Tronic
MG-Rover: Steptronic
Mitsubishi: INVECS, INVECS-II, Sportronic, Tiptronic
Nissan: Xtronic (also used in Xtronic CVT), DualMatic M-ATx
Opel / Vauxhall: ActiveSelect, Tiptronic
Peugeot: Tiptronic
Pontiac: TACshift (Touch Activated Control), TAPshift (Touch Activated Power), Driver Shift Control (DSC)
Proton: PROTRONIC
Subaru: Sportshift
Toyota: ECT
Volkswagen / Audi / SEAT / Škoda / Porsche: Tiptronic 
Volvo Cars: Geartronic

1950s automated clutch system 

The Automotive Products company in the United Kingdom produced an automated clutch system for automobiles in the 1950s called the Manumatic. This system is largely unrelated to later use of the term relating to automatic transmissions. The Manumatic was installed in cars with a manual transmission, allowing them to be driven without needing to use a clutch pedal. According to the modern use of the term it would be classified as an automated manual transmission and not as a manumatic transmission.

See also

Automated manual transmission
Automatic transmission
Dual clutch transmission

References 

Automotive transmission technologies